Events from the year 1681 in Ireland.

Incumbent
Monarch: Charles II

Events
July 1 – Oliver Plunkett, Roman Catholic Archbishop of Armagh and Primate of All Ireland, falsely convicted in June of treason, is hanged, drawn and quartered at Tyburn, London, the last Catholic martyr to die in England; he will be canonised in 1975. Anglo-Irish  Catholic intriguer Edward Fitzharris is executed in London on the same day.
September 19 – the Quaker William Bates and a small group of emigrants depart from Dublin aboard Ye Owners Adventure to settle in British America.

Arts and literature
The Dutch portrait painter Ludowyk Smits is active in Dublin.

Births

Deaths
July 1 – Oliver Plunkett, Roman Catholic Archbishop of Armagh and Primate of All Ireland (b.1629) (hanged)

References

 
1680s in Ireland
Ireland
Years of the 17th century in Ireland